The 2005 New York Yankees season was the 103rd season for the franchise. The team finished with a record of 95–67, tied with the Boston Red Sox but won the division due to winning the season series 10–9 over Boston. New York was managed by Joe Torre. The Yankees played at Yankee Stadium. In the playoffs, they lost in the ALDS in 5 games to the Los Angeles Angels of Anaheim. It was their eleventh year making the playoffs in a row.

Offseason
 December 3, 2004: Kenny Lofton was traded by the New York Yankees to the Philadelphia Phillies for Félix Rodríguez.
December 3, 2004: Félix Heredia was traded by the New York Yankees to the New York Mets for Mike Stanton.
 December 20, 2004: Carl Pavano signed as a free agent with the New York Yankees.
 December 28, 2004: Jaret Wright signed as a free agent with the New York Yankees.
January 11, 2005: Javier Vázquez, Brad Halsey, Dioner Navarro, and cash were traded by New York Yankees to the Arizona Diamondbacks for Randy Johnson.
January 21, 2005: Aaron Small signed as a free agent with the New York Yankees.
February 9, 2005: Buddy Groom signed as a free agent with the New York Yankees.
February 18, 2005: Ramiro Mendoza signed as a free agent with the New York Yankees.

Regular season

Season standings

Record vs. opponents

Notable transactions
July 1, 2005: Mike Stanton was released by the Yankees.
July 30, 2005: Alan Embree was signed as a free agent by the Yankees.
July 31, 2005: Buddy Groom was sent to the Arizona Diamondbacks by the New York Yankees as part of a conditional deal.
August 30, 2005: Mark Bellhorn was signed as a free agent with the New York Yankees.

Roster

Game log

|- align="center" bgcolor="bbffbb"
| 1 || April 3 || Red Sox || 9–2 || Johnson (1–0) || Wells (0–1) || || 54,818 || 1–0 || W1
|- align="center" bgcolor="bbffbb"
| 2 || April 5 || Red Sox || 4–3 || Rivera (1–0) || Foulke (0–1) || || 54,690 || 2–0 || W2
|- align="center" bgcolor="ffbbbb"
| 3 || April 6 || Red Sox || 3–7 || Timlin (1–0) || Rivera (1–1) || || 55,165 || 2–1 || L1
|- align="center" bgcolor="ffbbbb"
| 4 || April 8 || Orioles || 5–12 || Ponson (1–0) || Wright (0–1) || || 43,128 || 2–2 || L2
|- align="center" bgcolor="bbffbb"
| 5 || April 9 || Orioles || 8–5 || Sturtze (1–0) || Reed (0–1) || Rivera (1) || 50,275 || 3–2 || W1
|- align="center" bgcolor="ffbbbb"
| 6 || April 10 || Orioles || 2–7 || López (2–0) || Pavano (0–1) || || 46,797 || 3–3 || L1
|- align="center" bgcolor="ffbbbb"
| 7 || April 11 || @ Red Sox || 1–8 || Wakefield (1–0) || Mussina (0–1) || || 33,072 || 3–4 || L2
|- align="center" bgcolor="bbffbb"
| 8 || April 13 || @ Red Sox || 5–2 || Wright (1–1) || Schilling (0–1) || Rivera (2) || 35,115 || 4–4 || W1
|- align="center" bgcolor="ffbbbb"
| 9 || April 14 || @ Red Sox || 5–8 || Foulke (1–1) || Gordon (0–1) || || 35,251 || 4–5 || L1
|- align="center" bgcolor="ffbbbb"
| 10 || April 15 || @ Orioles || 1–8 || Chen (1–0) || Pavano (0–2) || || 48,061 || 4–6 || L2
|- align="center" bgcolor="ffbbbb"
| 11 || April 16 || @ Orioles || 6–7 || Kline (2–1) || Gordon (0–2)  || Ryan (2) || 48,598 || 4–7 || L3
|- align="center" bgcolor="ffbbbb"
| 12 || April 17 || @ Orioles || 4–8 || Cabrera (1–1) || Brown (0–1) || || 47,883 || 4–8 || L4
|- align="center" bgcolor="bbffbb"
| 13 || April 18 || Devil Rays || 19–8 || Wright (2–1) || Bell (1–1) || || 35,282 || 5–8 || W1
|- align="center" bgcolor="ffbbbb"
| 14 || April 19 || Devil Rays || 2–6 || Nomo (2–1) || Johnson (1–1) || || 45,802 || 5–9 || L1
|- align="center" bgcolor="bbffbb"
| 15 || April 20 || @ Blue Jays || 11–2 || Pavano (1–2) || Lilly (0–2) || || 22,838 || 6–9 || W1
|- align="center" bgcolor="bbffbb"
| 16 || April 21 || @ Blue Jays || 4–3 || Mussina (1–1) || Chacín (3–1) || Rivera (3) || 23,178 || 7–9 || W2
|- align="center" bgcolor="ffbbbb"
| 17 || April 22 || Rangers || 3–5 || Young (2–1) || Brown (0–2) || Cordero (8) || 42,710 || 7–10 || L1
|- align="center" bgcolor="ffbbbb"
| 18 || April 23 || Rangers || 2–10 || Park (2–1) || Wright (2–2) || || 44,731 || 7–11 || L2
|- align="center" bgcolor="bbffbb"
| 19 || April 24 || Rangers || 11–1 || Johnson (2–1) || Astacio (1–2) || || 42,732 || 8–11 || W1
|- align="center" bgcolor="bbffbb"
| 20 || April 26 || Angels || 12–4 || Pavano (2–2) || Colón (3–2) || || 36,328 || 9–11 || W2
|- align="center" bgcolor="ffbbbb"
| 21 || April 27 || Angels || 1–5 || Washburn (1–0) || Mussina (1–2) || || 37,934 || 9–12 || L1
|- align="center" bgcolor="ffbbbb"
| 22 || April 28 || Angels || 1–3 || Lackey (2–1) || Brown (0–3) || Rodríguez (5) || 51,951 || 9–13 || L2
|- align="center" bgcolor="ffbbbb"
| 23 || April 29 || Blue Jays || 0–2 || Halladay (4–1) || Johnson (2–2) || || 40,839 || 9–14 || L3
|- align="center" bgcolor="bbffbb"
| 24 || April 30 || Blue Jays || 4–3 || Rivera (2–1) || Chulk (0–1) || || 47,483 || 10–14 || W1
|-

|- align="center" bgcolor="ffbbbb"
| 25 || May 1 || Blue Jays || 6–8 || Walker (1–0) || Stanton (0–1) || Batista (7) || 54,224 || 10–15 || L1
|- align="center" bgcolor="bbffbb"
| 26 || May 2 || @ Devil Rays || 6–2 || Mussina (2–2) || Kazmir (0–3) || || 13,217 || 11–15 || W1
|- align="center" bgcolor="ffbbbb"
| 27 || May 3 || @ Devil Rays || 4–11 || Waechter (1–1) || Brown (0–4) || || 14,824 || 11–16 || L1
|- align="center" bgcolor="ffbbbb"
| 28 || May 4 || @ Devil Rays || 8–11 || Fossum (2–1) || Henn (0–1) || Báez (2) || 16,452 || 11–17 || L2
|- align="center" bgcolor="ffbbbb"
| 29 || May 5 || @ Devil Rays || 2–6 || Hendrickson (1–1) || Wang (0–1) || || 16,662 || 11–18 || L3
|- align="center" bgcolor="ffbbbb"
| 30 || May 6 || Athletics || 3–6 (10) || Dotel (1–0) || Rivera (2–2) || Calero (1) || 47,973 || 11–19 || L4
|- align="center" bgcolor="bbffbb"
| 31 || May 7 || Athletics || 5–0 || Mussina (3–2) || Blanton (0–3) || || 52,776 || 12–19 || W1
|- align="center" bgcolor="bbffbb"
| 32 || May 8 || Athletics || 6–0 || Brown (1–4) || Harden (2–2) || || 47,575 || 13–19 || W2
|- align="center" bgcolor="bbffbb"
| 33 || May 9 || Mariners || 4–3 || Johnson (3–2) || Nelson (0–1) || Rivera (4) || 38,079 || 14–19 || W2
|- align="center" bgcolor="bbffbb"
| 34 || May 10 || Mariners || 7–4 || Wang (1–1) || Sele (2–4) || Rivera (5) || 39,780 || 15–19 || W3
|- align="center" bgcolor="bbffbb"
| 35 || May 11 || Mariners || 13–9 || Quantrill (1–0) || Thornton (0–3) || || 47,844 || 16–19 || W4
|- align="center" bgcolor="bbffbb"
| 36 || May 13 || @ Athletics || 9–4 || Mussina (4–2) || Harden (2–3) || || 38,636 || 17–19 || W5
|- align="center" bgcolor="bbffbb"
| 37 || May 14 || @ Athletics || 15–6 || Brown (2–4) || Blanton (0–4) || || 41,180 || 18–19 || W6
|- align="center" bgcolor="bbffbb"
| 38 || May 15 || @ Athletics || 6–4 || Johnson (4–2) || Rincón (1–1) || Rivera (6) || 37,237 || 19–19 || W7
|- align="center" bgcolor="bbffbb"
| 39 || May 16 || @ Mariners || 6–3 || Wang (2–1) || Hasegawa (0–1) || Rivera (7) || 37,814 || 20–19 || W8
|- align="center" bgcolor="bbffbb"
| 40 || May 17 || @ Mariners || 6–0 || Pavano (3–2) || Mateo (1–1) || || 35,549 || 21–19 || W9
|- align="center" bgcolor="ffbbbb"
| 41 || May 18 || @ Mariners || 6–7 || Nelson (1–1) || Gordon (0–3) || Villone (1) || 37,419 || 21–20 || L1
|- align="center" bgcolor="bbffbb"
| 42 || May 20 || @ Mets || 5–2 || Brown (3–4) || Zambrano (2–4) || Rivera (8) || 55,740 || 22–20 || W1
|- align="center" bgcolor="ffbbbb"
| 43 || May 21 || @ Mets || 1–7 || Benson (2–1) || Johnson (4–3) || || 55,800 || 22–21 || L1
|- align="center" bgcolor="bbffbb"
| 44 || May 22 || @ Mets || 5–3 || Pavano (4–2) || Hernández (2–2) || Rivera (9) || 55,953 || 23–21 || W1
|- align="center" bgcolor="bbffbb"
| 45 || May 24 || Tigers || 12–3 || Mussina (5–2) || Ledezma (2–4) || || 37,099 || 24–21 || W2
|- align="center" bgcolor="bbffbb"
| 46 || May 25 || Tigers || 4–2 || Wang (3–1) || Maroth (4–4) || Rivera (10) || 51,833 || 25–21 || W3
|- align="center" bgcolor="bbffbb"
| 47 || May 26 || Tigers || 4–3 || Brown (4–4) || Bonderman (5–3) || Rivera (11) || 42,835 || 26–21 || W4
|- align="center" bgcolor="bbffbb"
| 48 || May 27 || Red Sox || 6–3 || Johnson (5–3) || Wakefield (4–4) || Rivera (12) || 55,051 || 27–21 || W5
|- align="center" bgcolor="ffbbbb"
| 49 || May 28 || Red Sox || 1–17 || Clement (6–0) || Pavano (4–3) || || 55,315 || 27–22 || L1
|- align="center" bgcolor="ffbbbb"
| 50 || May 29 || Red Sox || 2–7 || Wells (3–4) || Mussina (5–3) || || 55,235 || 27–23 || L2
|- align="center" bgcolor="ffbbbb"
| 51 || May 31 || @ Royals || 3–5 || Greinke (1–6) || Brown (4–5) || MacDougal (3) || 18,680 || 27–24 || L3
|-

|- align="center" bgcolor="ffbbbb"
| 52 || June 1 || @ Royals || 1–3 || Carrasco (1–1) || Johnson (5–4) || MacDougal (4) || 28,033 || 27–25 || L4
|- align="center" bgcolor="ffbbbb"
| 53 || June 2 || @ Royals || 2–5 || Jensen (2–1) || Pavano (4–4) || Burgos (2) || 25,590 || 27–26 || L5
|- align="center" bgcolor="ffbbbb"
| 54 || June 3 || @ Twins || 3–6 || Lohse (5–3) || Mussina (5–4) || Nathan (16) || 41,588 || 27–27 || L6
|- align="center" bgcolor="bbffbb"
| 55 || June 4 || @ Twins || 4–3 (10) || Gordon (1–3) || Nathan (1–2) || Rivera (13) || 45,553 || 28–27 || W1
|- align="center" bgcolor="ffbbbb"
| 56 || June 5 || @ Twins || 3–9 || Silva (4–3) || Brown (4–6) || || 37,349 || 28–28 || L1
|- align="center" bgcolor="ffbbbb"
| 57 || June 6 || @ Brewers || 3–4 || Davis (8–5) || Johnson (5–5) || Turnbow (9) || 34,627 || 28–29 || L2
|- align="center" bgcolor="ffbbbb"
| 58 || June 7 || @ Brewers || 1–2 || Sheets (2–5) || Pavano (4–5) || Turnbow (10) || 35,611 || 28–30 || L3
|- align="center" bgcolor="bbffbb"
| 59 || June 8 || @ Brewers || 12–3 || Mussina (6–4) || Capuano (5–5) || || 37,586 || 29–30 || W1
|- align="center" bgcolor="ffbbbb"
| 60 || June 10 || @ Cardinals || 1–8 || Marquis (8–3) || Wang (3–2) || || 50,250 || 29–31 || L1
|- align="center" bgcolor="bbffbb"
| 61 || June 11 || @ Cardinals || 5–0 || Johnson (6–5) || Mulder (7–4) || Rivera (14) || 50,177 || 30–31 || W1
|- align="center" bgcolor="ffbbbb"
| 62 || June 12 || @ Cardinals || 3–5 || King (1–1) || Sturtze (1–1) || Isringhausen (18) || 50,372 || 30–32 || L1
|- align="center" bgcolor="bbffbb"
| 63 || June 14 || Pirates || 9–0 || Mussina (7–4) || Wells (5–5) || || 44,541 || 31–32 || W1
|- align="center" bgcolor="bbffbb"
| 64 || June 15 || Pirates || 7–5 (10) || Rivera (3–2) || Mesa (0–5) || || 48,828 || 32–32 || W2
|- align="center" bgcolor="bbffbb"
| 65 || June 16 || Pirates || 6–1 || Johnson (7–5) || Pérez (5–5) || || 54,734 || 33–32 || W3
|- align="center" bgcolor="bbffbb"
| 66 || June 17 || Cubs || 9–6 || Stanton (1–1) || Ohman (2–1) || Rivera (15) || 54,773 || 34–32 || W4
|- align="center" bgcolor="bbffbb"
| 67 || June 18 || Cubs || 8–1 || Wang (4–2) || Rusch (5–3) || || 55,284 || 35–32 || W5
|- align="center" bgcolor="bbffbb"
| 68 || June 19 || Cubs || 6–3 || Mussina (8–4) || Mitre (2–2) || Rivera (16) || 55,060 || 36–32 || W6
|- align="center" bgcolor="ffbbbb"
| 69 || June 20 || Devil Rays || 4–5 || Fossum (3–5) || Henn (0–2) || Báez (10) || 43,543 || 36–33 || L1
|- align="center" bgcolor="bbffbb"
| 70 || June 21 || Devil Rays || 20–11 || Groom (1–0) || Harper (1–6) || || 40,271 || 37–33 || W1
|- align="center" bgcolor="ffbbbb"
| 71 || June 22 || Devil Rays || 3–5 || Kazmir (3–5) || Pavano (4–6) || Báez (11) || 48,452 || 37–34 || L1
|- align="center" bgcolor="ffbbbb"
| 72 || June 23 || Devil Rays || 4–9 || Hendrickson (3–4) || Wang (4–3) || Báez (12) || 45,382 || 37–35 || L2
|- align="center" bgcolor="ffbbbb"
| 73 || June 24 || Mets || 4–6 || Martínez (8–2) || Mussina (8–5) || || 55,297 || 37–36 || L3
|- align="center" bgcolor="ffbbbb"
| 74 || June 25 || Mets || 3–10 || Glavine (5–7) || Henn (0–3) || || 55,114 || 37–37 || L4
|- align="center" bgcolor="bbffbb"
| 75 || June 26 || Mets || 5–4 || Rivera (4–2) || Looper (2–3) || || 55,327 || 38–37 || W1
|- align="center" bgcolor="bbffbb"
| 76 || June 27 || @ Orioles || 6–4 || Sturtze (2–1) || Kline (2–3) || Rivera (17) || 45,801 || 39–27 || W2
|- align="center" bgcolor="ffbbbb"
| 77 || June 28 || @ Orioles || 4–5 (10) || Ryan (1–1) || Stanton (1–2) || || 47,465 || 39–38 || L1
|- align="center" bgcolor="bbbbbb"
| – || June 29 || @ Orioles || colspan=7| Postponed (rain).
|-

|- align="center" bgcolor="ffbbbb"
| 78 || July 1 || @ Tigers || 2–10 || Bonderman (10–5) || Johnson (7–6) || || 40,776 || 39–39 || L2
|- align="center" bgcolor="bbffbb"
| 79 || July 2 || @ Tigers || 8–4 || Gordon (2–3) || Percival (1–2) || || 41,207 || 40–39 || W1
|- align="center" bgcolor="bbffbb"
| 80 || July 3 || @ Tigers || 1–0 || Wang (5–3) || Robertson (3–7) || Rivera (18) || 40,056 || 41–39 || W2
|- align="center" bgcolor="bbffbb"
| 81 || July 4 || Orioles || 13–8 || Anderson (1–0) || Ryan (1–2) || || 53,844 || 42–39 || W3
|- align="center" bgcolor="bbffbb"
| 82 || July 5 || Orioles || 12–3 || Johnson (8–6) || López (7–5) || || 55,276 || 43–39 || W4
|- align="center" bgcolor="bbffbb"
| 83 || July 7 || Indians || 7–2 || Mussina (9–5) || Millwood (3–7) || || 52,201 || 44–39 || W5
|- align="center" bgcolor="bbffbb"
| 84 || July 8 || Indians || 5–4 || Wang (6–3) || Lee (9–4) || Rivera (19) || 52,938 || 45–39 || W6
|- align="center" bgcolor="ffbbbb"
| 85 || July 9 || Indians || 7–8 || Elarton (6–3) || May (1–4) || Wickman (23) || 54,366 || 45–40 || L1
|- align="center" bgcolor="bbffbb"
| 86 || July 10 || Indians || 9–4 || Johnson (9–6) || Westbrook (6–11) || Rivera (20) || 54,256 || 46–40 || W1
|- style="text-align:center;"
|colspan="10" style="background:#bbcaff;"|All-Star Break: AL defeats NL 7–5
|- align="center" bgcolor="bbffbb"
| 87 || July 14 || @ Red Sox || 8–6 || Gordon (3–3) || Schilling (1–3) || Rivera (21) || 35,232 || 47–40 || W2
|- align="center" bgcolor="ffbbbb"
| 88 || July 15 || @ Red Sox || 1–17 || Wells (7–5) || Redding (0–6) || || 35,083 || 47–41 || L1
|- align="center" bgcolor="bbffbb"
| 89 || July 16 || @ Red Sox || 7–4 || Johnson (10–6) || Clement (10–3) || Rivera (22) || 34,694 || 48–41 || W1
|- align="center" bgcolor="bbffbb"
| 90 || July 17 || @ Red Sox || 5–3 || Leiter (4–7) || Wakefield (8–8) || Rivera (23) || 34,802 || 49–41 || W2
|- align="center" bgcolor="bbffbb"
| 91 || July 18 || @ Rangers || 11–10 || Sturtze (3–1) || Brocail (3–2) || Rivera (24) || 46,538 || 50–41 || W3
|- align="center" bgcolor="ffbbbb"
| 92 || July 19 || @ Rangers || 1–2 || Loe (4–2) || Franklin (0–1) || Cordero (22) || 45,208 || 50–42 || L1
|- align="center" bgcolor="bbffbb"
| 93 || July 20 || @ Rangers || 8–4 || Small (1–0) || Benoit (1–1) || || 45,354 || 51–42 || W1
|- align="center" bgcolor="ffbbbb"
| 94 || July 21 || @ Angels || 5–6 || Colón (12–6) || Gordon (3–4) || Rodríguez (22) || 44,109 || 51–43 || L1
|- align="center" bgcolor="ffbbbb"
| 95 || July 22 || @ Angels || 3–6 || Lackey (8–4) || Leiter (4–8) || Rodríguez (23) || 44,043 || 51–44 || L2
|- align="center" bgcolor="ffbbbb"
| 96 || July 23 || @ Angels || 6–8 || Santana (5–4) || Brown (4–7) || Rodríguez (24) || 44,035 || 51–45 || L3
|- align="center" bgcolor="bbffbb"
| 97 || July 24 || @ Angels || 4–1 || Mussina (10–5) || Washburn (6–6) || Rivera (25) || 44,032 || 52–45 || W1
|- align="center" bgcolor="bbffbb"
| 98 || July 26 || Twins || 4–0 || Johnson (11–6) || Radke (6–10) || || 53,855 || 53–45 || W2
|- align="center" bgcolor="ffbbbb"
| 99 || July 27 || Twins || 3–7 || Santana (10–5) || Leiter (4–9) || Nathan (28) || 50,334 || 53–46 || L1
|- align="center" bgcolor="bbffbb"
| 100 || July 28 || Twins || 6–3 || Small (2–0) || Mays (5–6) || Rivera (26) || 53,524 || 54–46 || W1
|- align="center" bgcolor="ffbbbb"
| 101 || July 29 || Angels || 1–4 || Santana (6–4) || Mussina (10–6) || Rodríguez (26) || 54,025 || 54–47 || L1
|- align="center" bgcolor="bbffbb"
| 102 || July 30 || Angels || 8–7 || Rivera (5–2) || Rodríguez (2–2) || || 54,220 || 55–47 || W1
|- align="center" bgcolor="bbffbb"
| 103 || July 31 || Angels || 8–7 (11) || Gordon (4–4) || Gregg (1–2) || || 53,653 || 56–47 || W2
|-

|- align="center" bgcolor="ffbbbb"
| 104 || August 2 || @ Indians || 7–8 || Elarton (7–5) || Leiter (4–10) || Wickman (28) || 34,457 || 56–48 || L1
|- align="center" bgcolor="ffbbbb"
| 105 || August 3 || @ Indians || 4–7 || Lee (12–4) || Mussina (10–7) || Wickman (29) || 35,737 || 56–49 || L2
|- align="center" bgcolor="bbffbb"
| 106 || August 4 || @ Indians || 4–3 || Gordon (5–4) || Wickman (0–3) || Rivera (27) || 40,048 || 57–49 || W1
|- align="center" bgcolor="bbffbb"
| 107 || August 5 || @ Blue Jays || 6–2 || Small (3–0) || Chacín (11–6) || Rivera (28) || 43,688 || 58–49 || W2
|- align="center" bgcolor="ffbbbb"
| 108 || August 6 || @ Blue Jays || 5–8 || Walker (5–3) || Johnson (11–7) || || 48,088 || 58–50 || L1
|- align="center" bgcolor="bbffbb"
| 109 || August 7 || @ Blue Jays || 6–2 || Leiter (5–10) || Towers (8–9) || Rivera (29) || 46,114 || 59–50 || W1
|- align="center" bgcolor="bbffbb"
| 110 || August 8 || White Sox || 3–2 || Mussina (11–7) || Hernández (8–5) || Rivera (30) || 54,871 || 60–50 || W2
|- align="center" bgcolor="ffbbbb"
| 111 || August 9 || White Sox || 1–2 || Contreras (7–6) || Chacón (1–8) || Hermanson (29) || 53,946 || 60–51 || L1
|- align="center" bgcolor="ffbbbb"
| 112 || August 10 || White Sox || 1–2 (10) || Cotts (4–0) || Rivera (5–3) || Hermanson (30) || 54,635 || 60–52 || L2
|- align="center" bgcolor="bbffbb"
| 113 || August 11 || Rangers || 9–8 || Sturtze (4–1) || Baldwin (0–2) || Rivera (31) || 54,283 || 61–52 || W1
|- align="center" bgcolor="bbffbb"
| 114 || August 12 || Rangers || 6–5 || Leiter (6–10) || Wilson (0–5) || Sturtze (1) || 54,442 || 62–52 || W2
|- align="center" bgcolor="bbffbb"
| 115 || August 13 || Rangers || 7–5 (11) || Small (4–0) || Loe (5–4) || || 54,919 || 63–52 || W3
|- align="center" bgcolor="bbffbb"
| 116 || August 14 || Rangers || 10–3 || Chacón (2–8) || Benoit (3–2) || || 54,824 || 64–52 || W4
|- align="center" bgcolor="bbffbb"
| 117 || August 15 || @ Devil Rays || 5–2 || Wright (3–2) || Fossum (6–10) || Rivera (32) || 19,320 || 65–52 || W5
|- align="center" bgcolor="ffbbbb"
| 118 || August 16 || @ Devil Rays || 3–4 (11) || Orvella (2–2) || Embree (1–5) || || 20,678 || 65–53 || L1
|- align="center" bgcolor="ffbbbb"
| 119 || August 17 || @ Devil Rays || 6–7 || Miller (1–0) || Sturtze (4–2) || Báez (26) || 20,178 || 65–54 || L2
|- align="center" bgcolor="bbffbb"
| 120 || August 19 || @ White Sox || 3–1 || Mussina (12–7) || Garland (16–7) || Rivera (33) || 39,496 || 66–54 || W1
|- align="center" bgcolor="bbffbb"
| 121 || August 20 || @ White Sox || 5–0 || Chacón (3–8) || Hernández (8–6) || || 38,938 || 67–54 || W2
|- align="center" bgcolor="ffbbbb"
| 122 || August 21 || @ White Sox || 2–6 || Contreras (8–7) || Johnson (11–8) || || 39,480 || 67–55 || L1
|- align="center" bgcolor="bbffbb"
| 123 || August 22 || Blue Jays || 7–0 || Wright (4–2) || Downs (1–3) || || 50,162 || 68–55 || W1
|- align="center" bgcolor="bbffbb"
| 124 || August 23 || Blue Jays || 5–4 || Rivera (6–3) || Batista (5–5) || || 50,258 || 69–55 || W2
|- align="center" bgcolor="ffbbbb"
| 125 || August 24 || Blue Jays || 5–9 || Bush (3–7) || Mussina (12–8) || || 54,705 || 69–56 || L1
|- align="center" bgcolor="bbffbb"
| 126 || August 25 || Blue Jays || 6–2 || Chacón (4–8) || Chacín (11–7) || || 54,329 || 70–56 || W1
|- align="center" bgcolor="bbffbb"
| 127 || August 26 || Royals || 5–1 || Johnson (12–8) || Wood (4–5) || || 53,922 || 71–56 || W2
|- align="center" bgcolor="bbffbb"
| 128 || August 27 || Royals || 8–7 || Embree (2–5) || Camp (1–3) || || 54,452 || 72–56 || W3
|- align="center" bgcolor="bbffbb"
| 129 || August 28 || Royals || 10–3 || Leiter (7–10) || Greinke (3–16) || || 54,951 || 73–56 || W4
|- align="center" bgcolor="bbffbb"
| 130 || August 29 || @ Mariners || 7–4 || Small (5–0) || Thornton (0–4) || Rivera (34) || 41,731 || 74–56 || W5
|- align="center" bgcolor="ffbbbb"
| 131 || August 30 || @ Mariners || 3–8 || Harris (2–1) || Chacón (4–9) || || 37,773 || 74–57 || L1
|- align="center" bgcolor="bbffbb"
| 132 || August 31 || @ Mariners || 2–0 || Johnson (13–8) || Hernández (2–2) || Rivera (35) || 46,240 || 75–57 || W1
|-

|- align="center" bgcolor="ffbbbb"
| 133 || September 1 || @ Mariners || 1–5 || Sherrill (3–2) || Sturtze (4–3) || || 39,986 || 75–58 || L1
|- align="center" bgcolor="ffbbbb"
| 134 || September 2 || @ Athletics || 0–12 || Haren (12–10) || Leiter (7–11) || || 36,048 || 75–59 || L2
|- align="center" bgcolor="bbffbb"
| 135 || September 3 || @ Athletics || 7–0 || Small (6–0) || Saarloos (9–7) || || 40,076 || 76–59 || W1
|- align="center" bgcolor="bbffbb"
| 136 || September 4 || @ Athletics || 7–3 || Chacón (5–9) || Zito (12–11) || || 43,874 || 77–59 || W2
|- align="center" bgcolor="ffbbbb"
| 137 || September 6 || Devil Rays || 3–4 || Orvella (3–2) || Rivera (6–4) || Báez (34) || 48,820 || 77–60 || L1
|- align="center" bgcolor="bbffbb"
| 138 || September 7 || Devil Rays || 5–4 || Sturtze (5–3) || Borowski (1–3) || Rivera (36) || 52,928 || 78–60 || W1
|- align="center" bgcolor="ffbbbb"
| 139 || September 8 || Devil Rays || 4–7 || Hendrickson (9–7) || Wang (6–4) || Báez (35) || 49,673 || 78–61 || L1
|- align="center" bgcolor="bbffbb"
| 140 || September 9 || Red Sox || 8–4 || Small (7–0) || Wells (12–7) || || 55,024 || 79–61 || W1
|- align="center" bgcolor="ffbbbb"
| 141 || September 10 || Red Sox || 2–9 || Schilling (6–7) || Chacón (5–10) || || 55,076 || 79–62 || L1
|- align="center" bgcolor="bbffbb"
| 142 || September 11 || Red Sox || 1–0 || Johnson (14–8) || Wakefield (15–11) || Rivera (37) || 55,123 || 80–62 || W1
|- align="center" bgcolor="bbffbb"
| 143 || September 13 || @ Devil Rays || 17–3 || Wright (5–2) || Waechter (5–10) || || 14,048 || 81–62 || W2
|- align="center" bgcolor="bbffbb"
| 144 || September 14 || @ Devil Rays || 6–5 || Wang (7–4) || Orvella (3–3) || Rivera (38) || 14,396 || 82–62 || W3
|- align="center" bgcolor="bbffbb"
| 145 || September 15 || @ Devil Rays || 9–5 || Small (8–0) || McClung (6–10) || Rivera (39) || 18,391 || 83–62 || W4
|- align="center" bgcolor="bbffbb"
| 146 || September 16 || @ Blue Jays || 11–10 || Proctor (1–0) || Bush (5–9) || Rivera (40) || 36,543 || 84–62 || W5
|- align="center" bgcolor="bbffbb"
| 147 || September 17 || @ Blue Jays || 1–0 || Chacón (6–10) || Chacín (12–9) || Gordon (1) || 43,433 || 85–62 || W6
|- align="center" bgcolor="ffbbbb"
| 148 || September 18 || @ Blue Jays || 5–6 || Lilly (9–10) || Wright (5–3) || Batista (28) || 39,891 || 85–63 || L1
|- align="center" bgcolor="bbffbb"
| 149 || September 19 || Orioles || 3–2 || Rivera (7–4) || DuBose (1–3) || || 51,521 || 86–63 || W1
|- align="center" bgcolor="bbffbb"
| 150 || September 20 || Orioles || 12–9 || Small (9–0) || Maine (2–2) || || 46,982 || 87–63 || W2
|- align="center" bgcolor="bbffbb"
| 151 || September 21 || Orioles || 2–1 || Johnson (15–8) || López (14–11) || Rivera (41) || 50,382 || 88–63 || W3
|- align="center" bgcolor="bbffbb"
| 152 || September 22 || Orioles || 7–6 || Mussina (13–8) || Chen (12–10) || Gordon (2) || 52,368 || 89–63 || W4
|- align="center" bgcolor="bbffbb"
| 153 || September 23 || Blue Jays || 5–0 || Chacón (7–10) || Lilly (9–11) || || 53,175 || 90–63 || W5
|- align="center" bgcolor="ffbbbb"
| 154 || September 24 || Blue Jays || 4–7 || Downs (4–3) || Wright (5–4) || Batista (30) || 53,911 || 90–64 || L1
|- align="center" bgcolor="bbffbb"
| 155 || September 25 || Blue Jays || 8–4 || Wang (8–4) || Towers (12–12) || Rivera (42) || 55,136 || 91–64 || W1
|- align="center" bgcolor="bbffbb"
| 156 || September 26 || @ Orioles || 11–3 || Johnson (16–8) || López (14–12) || || 43,039 || 92–64 || W2
|- align="center" bgcolor="ffbbbb"
| 157 || September 27 || @ Orioles || 9–17 || Rakers (1–0) || Leiter (7–12) || || 29,557 || 92–65 ||L1
|- align="center" bgcolor="bbffbb"
| 158 || September 28 || @ Orioles || 2–1 || Chacón (8–10) || Cabrera (10–13) || Rivera (43) || 30,539 || 93–65 ||W1
|- align="center" bgcolor="bbffbb"
| 159 || September 29 || @ Orioles || 8–4 || Small (10–0) || Bédard (6–8) || || 36,821 || 94–65 || W2
|- align="center" bgcolor="ffbbbb"
| 160 || September 30 || @ Red Sox || 3–5 || Wells (15–7) || Wang (8–5) || Timlin (13) || 34,832 || 94–66 || L1
|- align="center" bgcolor="bbffbb"
| 161 || October 1 || @ Red Sox || 8–4 || Johnson (17–8) || Wakefield (16–12) || || 34,556 || 95–66 || W1
|- align="center" bgcolor="ffbbbb"
| 162 || October 2 || @ Red Sox || 1–10 || Schilling (8–8) || Wright (5–5) || || 34,534 || 95–67 || L1
|-

|- align="center" bgcolor="bbffbb"
| 1 || October 4 || @ Angels || 4–2 || Mussina (1–0) || Colón (0–1) || Rivera (1) || 45,142 || 1–0 || W1
|- align="center" bgcolor="ffbbbb"
| 2 || October 5 || @ Angels || 3–5 || Escobar (1–0) || Wang (0–1) || Rodríguez (1) || 45,150 || 1–1 || L1
|- align="center" bgcolor="ffbbbb"
| 3 || October 7 || Angels || 7–11 || Shields (1–0) || Small (0–1) || || 56,277 || 1–2 || L2
|- align="center" bgcolor="bbffbb"
| 4 || October 9 || Angels || 3–2 || Leiter (1–0) || Shields (1–1) || Rivera (2) || 56,226 || 2–2 || W1
|- align="center" bgcolor="ffbbbb"
| 5 || October 10 || @ Angels || 3–5 || Santana (1–0) || Mussina (1–1) || Rodríguez (2) || 45,133 || 2–3 || L1
|-

Player stats

Batting

Starters by position and other batters 
Note: Pos = Position; G = Games played; AB = At bats; H = Hits; Avg. = Batting average; HR = Home runs; RBI = Runs batted in

Pitching

Starting pitchers 
Note: G = Games pitched; GS = Games started; IP = Innings pitched; W = Wins; L = Losses; ERA = Earned run average; SO = Strikeouts

Other pitchers 
Note: G = Games pitched; IP = Innings pitched; W = Wins; L = Losses; ERA = Earned run average; SO = Strikeouts

Relief pitchers 
Note: G = Games pitched; W = Wins; L = Losses; SV = Saves; ERA = Earned run average; SO = Strikeouts

Postseason

ALDS

Farm system

LEAGUE CHAMPIONS: Staten Island,  GCL YankeesBaseball America 2006 Annual Directory

References

External links

2005 New York Yankees at Baseball Reference
2005 New York Yankees team page at www.baseball-almanac.com

New York Yankees seasons
New York Yankees
New York Yankees
2000s in the Bronx
American League East champion seasons